Club de Fútbol Correcaminos de la Universidad Autónoma de Tamaulipas Premier is a professional football team that plays in the Mexican Football League. They are playing in the Liga Premier Serie A. Club de Fútbol Correcaminos de la Universidad Autónoma de Tamaulipas Premier is affiliated with UAT that plays in the Liga de Expansión MX. The games are held in the city of Ciudad Victoria in the Estadio Marte R. Gómez and Estadio Universitario Eugenio Alvizo Porras as a backup stadium.

Players

Current squad

References

External links

Football clubs in Tamaulipas
Correcaminos UAT
Liga Premier de México